Iván Gómez (born 28 February 1997), is an Argentine professional footballer who plays as a midfielder for Platense on loan from Estudiantes de La Plata.

References

External links

1997 births
Living people
Argentine footballers
Association football midfielders
Estudiantes de La Plata footballers
Club Atlético Platense footballers
Argentine Primera División players
Footballers from La Plata